Wellington Nobre de Morais known as Deda (Brasília, 3 July 1975) is a former Brazilian footballer who played as a defensive midfielder.

Career
Deda was a member of Gama's team who won the 1998 Brasileirão Série B. Hw won 8 state titles with Gama and 4 with Gama's biggest rival, Brasiliense. He played football from 1996 until 2017.

Honours

Club
Gama
Campeonato Brasileiro Série B: 1998
Campeonato Brasiliense: 1994, 1995, 1997, 1998, 1999, 2000, 2001, 2003

Brasiliense
Campeonato Brasileiro Série B: 2004
Campeonato Brasiliense: 2004, 2005, 2006, 2011

Rio Branco-SP
Campeonato Paulista Série A3: 2012

Grêmio Novorizontino
Campeonato Paulista Série A3: 2014

References

1975 births
Living people
Brazilian footballers
Association football midfielders
Campeonato Brasileiro Série A players
Campeonato Brasileiro Série B players
Brasiliense Futebol Clube players
Footballers from Brasília